United Nations Security Council Resolution 115, adopted on 20 June 1956, after examining the application of the Morocco for membership in the United Nations the Council recommended to the General Assembly that the Morocco be admitted.

The resolution was approved by all 11 members of the Council.

See also
List of United Nations Security Council Resolutions 101 to 200 (1953–1965)

References
Text of the Resolution at undocs.org

External links
 

 0115
 0115
 0115
1956 in Morocco
June 1956 events